Cağ kebabı, also called Yatık Döner, is a horizontally stacked marinated rotating lamb kebab variety, originating in Erzurum Province, Turkey.

This uniquely prepared kebab has become, as years passed, a trademark of Erzurum where all the famous Usta, like Şakir Aktaş and Kemâl Koç, run restaurants. Each claiming to be descending from the exclusive inventors.

Note that while it is increasingly available in most Turkish cities, the Cağ kebabı is especially popular in Erzurum, whereas enjoying an ever-growing success in Istanbul and Ankara.

History
Ottoman travel books of the eighteenth century cite a kebab cooked on wood fire consisting of a horizontal stack of meat, known as "Cağ Kebabı" in the Eastern Turkish province of Erzurum, which is probably the earlier form of döner as known.

Now, the kebab is very famous in Erzurum, Istanbul and many other States in the EU.

Etymology
The Turkish word cağ borrowed from Armeno-Georgian. It means "spit" or skewer. Hence the name of the kebab that consists of meat impaled on a huge spit.

Preparation
Slices of lamb and large quantities of tail fat are left to marinate in a mixture of basil, black pepper, salt and sliced onions for the length of a day. They are then impaled on the spit (Cağ), and stacked thickly. The spit is then locked and transferred to the fire, where there is a fairly complicated device that controls the cooking of the spit. This typically includes a mechanism for turning the meat, another one for raising and lowering it, and also dents on the side to move the stack towards the fire as it gets thinner after servings are repeatedly cut away.

The meat used for Cağ kebabı is exclusively lamb.

See also

 List of kebabs
 List of lamb dishes
 List of spit-roasted foods
 Turkish cuisine

Notes

References

External links
 https://web.archive.org/web/20100110123901/http://www.gelgorcagkebabi.com/ - the restaurant of Şakir Aktaş in Oltu, Erzurum, claiming the invention
 http://www.cagkebap.com - the restaurant of Kemâl Koç from Tortum, Erzurum, claiming the invention

Turkish cuisine
Middle Eastern grilled meats
Erzurum
Lamb dishes
Mediterranean cuisine
Middle Eastern cuisine
Skewered kebabs
Spit-cooked foods
Turkish words and phrases